Farzand is a 2018 Indian Marathi-language historical drama War film directed by Digpal Lanjekar and produced by Anirban Sarkar under the banner of Swami Samarth Creations LLP. The film was co-produced by Sandip Jadhav, Mahesh Jaurkar and Swapnil Potdar. The film stars Prasad Oak, Ankit Mohan, Chinmay Mandlekar, Mrinal Kulkarni, Mrunmayee Deshpande, Neha Joshi and Sameer Dharmadhikari. It's the first of the series in an eight movie series on Maratha Empire. It was followed by  the movie Fatteshikast.

Farzand follows the story of warrior Kondaji Farzand, who along with 60 warriors defeated 2500 soldiers of the enemy to win the Panhala fort in just three and half hours in 1673. The film was released on 1 June 2018. The film received generally positive reviews and was declared a commercial success.

Plot
The story begins with the fall of Tanaji Malusare (Ganesh Yadav), in capturing Kondana fort near Pune from a Mughal garrison in 1670. Three years later, when Shivaji's coronation to be held, Shivaji (Chinmay Mandlekar) wishes that he is crowned only when his kingdom and his people have peace and security. Panhala fort is still under the command of a cruel general, Beshak Khan, of the Adil Shah of Bijapur, whose forces harass the peasantry. The previous attempt to capture the fort in 1666, which he had held briefly in 1660 had failed. To recapture the fort, a mission is planned and Shivaji appoints Kondaji Farzand (Ankit Mohan) general for the mission. Farzand picks 60 soldiers for an assault on the fort defended by the 2500-strong garrison. Bahirji Naik (Prasad Oak), the spy, and an informer Kesar (Mrunmayee Deshpande) helped in defeating 2500 soldiers of the enemy to win the Panhala fort in just three and half hours.

Cast 
 Chinmay Mandlekar as Shivaji Maharaj
 Prasad Oak as Bahirji Naik the spy
 Mrinal Kulkarni as Jijabai
 Ankit Mohan as Sardar Kondaji Farzand (voice dubbed by Sachit Patil)

 Mrunmayee Deshpande as Kesar
 Neha Joshi as Kamali (wife of Kondaji)
 Sameer Dharmadhikari as Sardar Beshak Khan
 Ganesh Yadav as  Subhedar Tanaji Malusare
 Nikhil Raut as Kisna
 Pravin Tarde as Martya Ramoshi
 Ajay Purkar as Motyaji Khalekar
 Astad Kale as Gundoji 
 Pradhuman Singh as Kamad Khan
 Harish Dudhade as Ganoji Kawle
 Rahul Mehendale as Anajipant Surnis 
 Rajan Bhise as Hiroji Indalkar
 Ganesh Tidke as Budhaji

Production
The principal photography began in November 2017.

Release
The film was theatrically released on 1 June 2018.

Soundtrack

The songs for the film are composed by  Amitraj and lyrics by Digpal Lanjekar and Kshitij Patavrdhan.

Reception

Critical response 
Renuka Vyavahare of The Times of India rated the film with three and a half stars out of five and praised the casting. She noted that it lent credibility to this Marathi period film. Mentioning Ankit Mohan, Chinmay Mandlekar, Prasad Oak, Mrunmayee Deshpande and Mrinal Kulkarni, she praised their acting. She felt that  lack of scale and Visual effects, was made up by performances and intent. Concluding, she said, "Farzand turns out to be more informative than entertaining, but it does manage to fairly engage you, even more if you happen to be a history enthusiast, a vigilante or a rebel with a cause." Ganesh Matkari of Pune Mirror gave the film three stars out of five, concurring with Vyavahare he praised the ensemble. He criticized the clean approach to the film as he noted, "But as we see them entering the fort and even in the middle of a fight, there isn’t a spot of dirt on their bright uniforms." He concluded, "Farzand is an ambitious, but old-school film which promises an engrossing experience, if you are willing to adjust your expectations." Lokmat rated the film with three and half stars out of five. Abhay Salvi of Marathi Stars rated the film with three and half stars out of five and noted, "For all Maharaj devotees Farzand is the film they were waiting for! And for other Marathi audiences too for the first time you could experience a spirited historical epic that has great performances & which also shies away from too much jingoism."

Box office
The life time collection of the Farzand was 10 crores, and the film was declared a commercial success.

Home video
The film was made available as VOD on Hotstar in  2018.

References

External links 
 

2018 films
Indian historical drama films
Indian war drama films
2010s historical drama films
2010s Marathi-language films
2018 war drama films
Films set in the Maratha Empire
2010s historical action films
Cultural depictions of Shivaji
Indian historical action films
2018 drama films